Muhammad Manna (born 10 December 1938) is a Pakistani field hockey player. He competed in the 1964 Summer Olympics, where he was a member of the silver medal winning team.

References

External links
 

1938 births
Living people
Field hockey players at the 1964 Summer Olympics
Pakistani male field hockey players
Olympic field hockey players of Pakistan
Olympic silver medalists for Pakistan
Olympic medalists in field hockey
Medalists at the 1964 Summer Olympics
Asian Games medalists in field hockey
Field hockey players at the 1958 Asian Games
Asian Games gold medalists for Pakistan
Medalists at the 1958 Asian Games
20th-century Pakistani people